Type IV hypersensitivity, often called delayed-type hypersensitivity, is a type of hypersensitivity reaction that can take a day or more to develop. Unlike the other types, it is not humoral (not antibody-mediated) but rather is a type of cell-mediated response. This response involves the interaction of T cells, monocytes, and macrophages.

This reaction is caused when CD4+ Th1 cells recognize foreign antigen in a complex with the MHC class II on the surface of antigen-presenting cells. These can be macrophages that secrete IL-12, which stimulates the proliferation of further CD4+ Th1 cells. CD4+ T cells secrete IL-2 and interferon gamma (IFNγ), inducing the further release of other Th1 cytokines, thus mediating the immune response. Activated CD8+ T cells destroy target cells on contact, whereas activated macrophages produce hydrolytic enzymes and, on presentation with certain intracellular pathogens, transform into multinucleated giant cells.

The overreaction of the helper T cells and overproduction of cytokines damage tissues, cause inflammation, and cell death. Type IV hypersensitivity can usually be resolved with topical corticosteroids and trigger avoidance.

Forms

An example of a tuberculosis (TB) infection that comes under control: M. tuberculosis cells are engulfed by macrophages after being identified as foreign, but due to an immuno-escape mechanism peculiar to mycobacteria, TB bacteria are able to block the fusion of their enclosing phagosome with lysosomes which would destroy the bacteria. Thereby TB can continue to replicate within macrophages. After several weeks, the immune system somehow [mechanism as yet unexplained] ramps up and, on stimulation with IFN-gamma, the macrophages become capable of killing M. tuberculosis by forming phagolysosomes and nitric oxide radicals. The hyper-activated macrophages secrete TNF-α which recruits multiple monocytes to the site of infection. These cells differentiate into epithelioid cells which wall off the infected cells, but results in significant inflammation and local damage.

Some other clinical examples:
Urushiol-induced contact dermatitis
Temporal arteritis
Leprosy
Coeliac disease
Graft-versus-host disease
Chronic transplant rejection

See also
Hypersensitivity
Type I hypersensitivity
Type II hypersensitivity
Type III hypersensitivity
Type IV hypersensitivity

References

External links 

Hypersensitivity